Lake Township is a township in Vernon County, in the U.S. state of Missouri.

Lake Township most likely took its name from a small lake within its borders.

References

Townships in Missouri
Townships in Vernon County, Missouri